Petrosaviaceae is a family of flowering plants belonging to a monotypic order, Petrosaviales. Petrosaviales are monocots, and are grouped within the lilioid monocots. Petrosaviales are a very small order (one family, two genera and four species were accepted in 2016) of photosynthetic (Japonolirion) and rare leafless achlorophyllous, mycoheterotrophic plants (Petrosavia) found in dark montane rainforests in Japan, China, Southeast Asia and Borneo. They are characterised by having bracteate racemes, pedicellate flowers, six persistent tepals, septal nectaries, three almost distinct carpels, simultaneous microsporogenesis, monosulcate pollen, and follicular fruit.

Taxonomy
The family has only been recognized in modern classifications, previously the plants involved were usually treated as belonging to the family Liliaceae. The APG II system recognized the family and assigned it to the clade monocots, unplaced as to order.  The APG III system of 2009 and the APG IV system of 2016 placed family Petrosaviaceae in order Petrosaviales.

Genera
, two genera are accepted by the World Checklist of Selected Plant Families:
 Japonolirion Nakai, with one species
 Petrosavia Becc, with three species

Distribution and habitat
The plants in both genera are found in high-elevation habitats.

References

Bibliography

External links
 Petrosavia in Flora of China
 links at CSDL, Texas
 The Plant List

Monocot families
Petrosaviales